John Meade's Woman is a 1937 American drama film directed by Richard Wallace and written by John Bright, Vincent Lawrence, Herman J. Mankiewicz and Robert Tasker. The film stars Edward Arnold, Francine Larrimore, Gail Patrick, George Bancroft, John Trent and Sidney Blackmer. The film was released on February 26, 1937, by Paramount Pictures.

Plot

Cast 
Edward Arnold as John Meade
Francine Larrimore as Teddy Connor
Gail Patrick as Caroline Haig
George Bancroft as Tim Mathews
John Trent as Mike
Sidney Blackmer as Rodney
Jonathan Hale as Mr. Melton
Aileen Pringle as Mrs. Melton
Stanley Andrews as Westley
Harry Hayden as Gallatin
Robert Strange as Blaney

References

External links 
 

1937 films
Paramount Pictures films
American drama films
1937 drama films
Films directed by Richard Wallace
Films scored by Friedrich Hollaender
Films with screenplays by Herman J. Mankiewicz
American black-and-white films
1930s English-language films
1930s American films